USS O-16 (SS-77) was one of 16 O-class submarines built for the United States Navy during World War I.

Description
The later O-boats (O-11 through O-16) were designed by Lake Torpedo Boat Company to different specifications from the earlier ones designed by Electric Boat. They did not perform as well, and are sometimes considered a separate class. They displaced  on the surface and  submerged. The O-class submarines had a crew of 29 officers and enlisted men.

For surface running, the boats were powered by two  diesel engines, each driving one propeller shaft. When submerged each propeller was driven by a  electric motor. They could reach  on the surface and  underwater.

The boats were armed with four 18-inch (450 mm)  torpedo tubes in the bow. They carried four reloads, for a total of eight torpedoes. The O-class submarines were also armed with a single 3"/50 caliber deck gun.

Construction and career
O-16 was laid down on 7 October 1916 by California Shipbuilding Company in Long Beach, California. The boat was launched on 9 February 1918 sponsored by Mrs. I. H. Mayfield, and commissioned on 1 August 1918. Commissioning during the final months of World War I, O-16 had little wartime duty. After the war, she reported to Cape May, New Jersey, where she went into dry-dock on 20 September 1919. In October, the boat sailed to Philadelphia, Pennsylvania, where a dangerous fire in her superstructure on 29 December was brought under control before it did major damage.

In 1922, O-16 was stationed at Coco Solo, Panama Canal Zone, for diving tests and maneuvers. In April, she returned to Coco Solo, where electricians and engineers put her in prime condition.

In November 1923, O-16 sailed to Philadelphia, where she decommissioned on 21 June 1924 after just five and a half years of service, and was turned over to the Commandant, Navy Yard, Philadelphia. Struck from the Naval Vessel Register on 9 May 1930, the boat was scrapped in accordance with the London Naval Treaty on 30 July 1930.

Notes

References

External links
 

United States O-class submarines
World War I submarines of the United States
Ships built in Los Angeles
1918 ships